Sue McAllister CB was the Director General of the Northern Ireland Prison Service between 2012 and 2016. She was the first woman to hold the post. Prior to this, she was Governor of HM Prison Gartree and HM Prison Onley.

Career
Originally from South Yorkshire, Sue McAllister joined Her Majesty's Prison Service in England and Wales and worked for the service for 25 years. This included roles as the Governor of both HM Prison Gartree, an adult prison, and HM Prison Onley, a young offender institutions. McAllister was involved in the review team who investigated the suicide of Colin Bell, an offender under the care of the Northern Ireland Prison Service at HM Prison Maghaberry in 2008. The report was highly critical of the way in which his case was managed. She then worked in the Ministry of Justice as head of the Public Sector Bids Unit until she retired in 2012.

She was announced in May 2012 as the new head of the Northern Ireland Prison Service, the first time a woman was named to this post, or a similar post elsewhere in the UK. McAllister replaced Colin McConnell, who had become head of the Scottish Prison Service. She took over the post in July 2012. In August 2016, she announced that she would be resigning from the post in October that year in order to retire. McAllister was named a Companion of the Bath in Queen Elizabeth II's 2017 New Years honours for services to the Northern Ireland Prison Service.

Personal life
McAllister is married to Danny McAllister CBE with two children.

References

Living people
People from Grimethorpe
British prison governors
British prison officials
Year of birth missing (living people)